Monica Renee Louwerens (born October 27, 1973 in Vancouver, British Columbia, Canada) is a Canadian-American actress and beauty queen who has competed in the Miss America pageant and has appeared on numerous episodes of Power Rangers.

Early life

Miss America pageant
Louwerens, at the time an American citizen and resident of Greenville, Mississippi, won the Miss Mississippi 1995 title in the summer of 1995. She went on to represent her state at the Miss America 1996 pageant held in Atlantic City, New Jersey in September 1995. Louwerens placed in the top ten of the nationally televised pageant, which was won by Shawntel Smith of Oklahoma. Her talent was a vocal performance of Vanilla Ice Cream from the musical She Loves Me.

Louwerens graduated from Wesleyan University in May, 1995 with honors with a BA in English and Theater. She was a member of the Alpha Delta Phi society's Middletown chapter.

Career
Louwerens has appeared as Angela Fairweather in the Power Rangers Lightspeed Rescue series.

Then she appeared in the hit TV show Heroes. In the episode "Distractions", she plays a woman that gets her purse stolen by Peter (played by Milo Ventimiglia) in the first 10 minutes of the episode.

When she worked on Doom Patrol, she voiced and motion-captured Crazy Jane's personality known as the Weird Sisters.

Filmography

Live-action/television roles
 The Joe and Buzz Show - Amy Ann
 The Chronicle - Jane
 Pacific Blue - Claire Trewitt
 Power Rangers Lightspeed Rescue - Ms. Angela Fairweather
 Power Rangers Time Force - Mainframe Computer (voice, uncredited), Timeship Computer (voice, uncredited), Ms. Angela Fairweather-Rawlings
 Power Rangers Wild Force - Karaoke Org, Flute Org (voices)
 The Closer - Smiling Gate Agent
 The Vampire Diaries - Doctor
 Doom Patrol - The Weird Sisters (in "Jane Patrol")
 Creepshow - Debra's Mom (in "Queen Bee")

References

External links
 

Living people
1973 births
Canadian emigrants to the United States
Canadian television actresses
Miss America 1996 delegates
Actresses from Vancouver
Wesleyan University alumni
Miss Mississippi winners